Amanda J. Dobbs (born August 10, 1993) is an American former competitive figure skater. As a single skater, she placed fourth at the 2010 Four Continents Championships. She also competed in pair skating on the national senior level with Joseph Jacobsen .

Personal life
Dobbs was born in Clovis, California and lives in Mission Viejo, California. She attends Laurel Springs School. Her uncle played for the Texas Rangers.

Career

Early career
Dobbs began competing in 2003 on the Intermediate level. In 2004, she won the silver medal on the intermediate level at the 2005 Central Pacific Regionals. She also competed in pair skating with Christopher Trefil on the intermediate level. They won the pewter medal at the 2005 U.S. Junior Championships.

She moved up to the novice level for the 2005–2006 season and placed 7th at her regional championship. With Trefil in pairs, she also competed on the novice level. They won the silver medal at their sectional championship and qualified for the 2006 U.S. Figure Skating Championships, where they placed 5th.

In the 2006–2007 season, she remained on the novice level. She won her regional championship and advanced to her sectional championship, where she placed 6th.

In the 2007–2008 season, Dobbs moved up to the junior level. She won her regional championship and won the bronze medal at her sectional championship to qualify for the 2008 U.S. Figure Skating Championships, where she placed 5th. She was assigned to the 2008 International Challenge Cup, where she won the bronze medal.

2008–2009 season
In the 2008–2009 season, Dobbs debuted on the ISU Junior Grand Prix circuit. At the 2008–2009 ISU Junior Grand Prix event in Mexico, she won the gold medal and was assigned to a second event by U.S. Figure Skating. At her second event, in South Africa, she won the bronze medal. She qualified in fifth position to the 2008–2009 ISU Junior Grand Prix Final. At the Junior Grand Prix Final, she placed 7th.

By qualifying to the Junior Grand Prix Final, she had earned a bye to the 2009 U.S. Figure Skating Championships. Dobbs competed on the junior level and placed 7th.

Following that season, Dobbs teamed up with Joseph Jacobsen to compete in pair skating while still competing as a single skater.

2009–2010 season
In the 2009–2010 season, Dobbs competed in single and pair skating. She made her senior international debut at the 2009 Ice Challenge in Graz and won the bronze medal. The timing of this competition gave her a bye through the regional championships to her sectional championships. At the 2010 Pacific Coast Sectional Figure Skating Championships, held in the fall of 2009, Dobbs qualified for the 2010 U.S. Figure Skating Championships by winning the pewter medals in both the singles event and the pairs event.

At the 2010 U.S. Championships, Dobbs placed 6th in the ladies event, and 7th in the pairs event with Jacobsen.

Because the 2010 Four Continents Figure Skating Championships were held so close to the U.S. Championships, U.S. Figure Skating had submitted possible entries in advance. Dobbs was on the alternate list for Four Continents and was assigned to the event following the 2010 U.S. Championships. Dobbs & Jacobsen were not listed as alternates and so could not have been sent; but were the fourth alternates for the 2010 World Figure Skating Championships.

At the Four Continents Championships, she placed second in the short program with 57.56 points, 1.32 behind Akiko Suzuki. She finished fourth overall.

2010–2011 season
Dobbs was assigned to one senior Grand Prix event, the 2010 Cup of China, and finished sixth.

Coaching
As of 2020, she coaches out of the Detroit Skating Club.

Programs

Singles

Pairs with Jacobsen

Pairs with Trefil

Competitive highlights
GP: Grand Prix; JGP: Junior Grand Prix

Ladies' singles

Pairs with Jacobsen

Pairs with Trefil

Detailed results
Small medals for short and long programs awarded only at ISU Championships.

Singles career

References

External links

 
 
 Amanda Dobbs

1993 births
Living people
American female pair skaters
American female single skaters
Sportspeople from Clovis, California
21st-century American women
20th-century American women